In legal terms, an Act of Indemnity is a statute passed to protect people who have committed some illegal act which would otherwise cause them to be subjected to legal penalties. International treaties may contain articles that bind states to abide by similar terms which may involve the parties to the treaty passing domestic legislation to implement the indemnity laid out in the treaty.

International treaties
Treaty of Westphalia 1648 (Art 2)
 Treaty of Küçük Kaynarca 1774 (Art I)

Domestic laws

United Kingdom and preceding states
The United Kingdom has three legal jurisdictions. Those acts passed during the Interregnum (1649–1660) were themselves rendered null and void with the Restoration of the monarchy in England, Scotland and Ireland in 1660.

England and Wales
Act of General Pardon and Oblivion 1652, passed by the Rump Parliament during the First Commonwealth
Act of Indemnity and Free Pardon 1659, during the Second Commonwealth 
Indemnity and Oblivion Act (or Act of Indemnity 1660), following the Restoration
Indemnity Act 1690, following the Glorious Revolution
Indemnity Act 1703
Indemnity Act 1717, following the Jacobite rising of 1715
Indemnity Act 1727, relieved Dissenters from the oaths of the Test and Corporation Acts
Indemnity Act 1747, following the Jacobite rising of 1745
Indemnity Act 1767, one of the Townshend Acts, relating to the British colonies in North America
 Coatbridge & Springburn Elections (Validation) Act 1945
 Camberwell, Bristol & Nottingham Elections (Validation) Act 1945
 House of Commons (Indemnification of certain Members) Act 1949
 Reverend J. G. MacManaway's Indemnity Act 1951
 Price Control & Other Orders (Indemnity) Act 1951
 Niall Macpherson Indemnity Act 1954
 Validation of Elections Act 1955
 Validation of Elections (No. 2) Act 1955
 Validation of Elections (No. 3) Act 1955
 Charles Beattie Indemnity Act 1956
 Town and Country Planning Regulations (London) (Indemnity) Act 1970

Scotland
Act of Pardon and Grace to the People of Scotland 1654 (Cromwell's Act of Grace)
Act of indemnity and oblivion (Scotland) 1660

Ireland prior to 1921 and Northern Ireland
Act of Free and General Pardon, Indemnity, and Oblivion [for Ireland] 1664–1665?
Northern Ireland (Sentences) Act 1998 see also Sentence Review Commission

Bangladesh
Indemnity Act, Bangladesh, which gave immunity from legal action to the persons involved in the assassination of president Sheikh Mujibur Rahman

South Africa
Indemnity Act, 1961, which gave immunity to the government in relation to the Sharpeville massacre
Indemnity Act, 1977, which gave immunity to the government in relation to the Soweto uprising

Notes

References